Berlyachevo (Berläś) is a rural locality (a village) in Badrakovsky Selsoviet, Burayevsky District, Bashkortostan, Russia. The population was 236 as of 2010. There are four streets.

Geography 
Berlyachevo is located 21 km southwest of Burayevo (the district's administrative centre) by road. Uleyevo is the nearest rural locality.

References 

Rural localities in Burayevsky District